Hikmat Huseyn oglu Hasanov (born 1975) is an Azerbaijani major general, who is the commander of the 1st Army Corps (since December 2014). He is a laureate of the 3rd degree "For Service to the Fatherland" order.

Life and service 
Hikmat Hasanov was born on 9 October 1975 in Pirəhmədli, Fuzuli District, then Azerbaijani SSR of the Soviet Union. In 1992, he entered the Baku Higher Combined Arms Command School. He began his service as a platoon commander in the military unit "N" in Tartar District. In 1994, he took a 6-month course at the Infantry School Command in Tuzla, Turkey. In 2002, he entered the Nanjing Land Forces Higher Military Academy of the People's Liberation Army of China to continue his education. He graduated from the academy with honors and was awarded a special badge. In 1995, he graduated from the military school and began serving in the "N" brigade in the Aghdam District. He was promoted to unit commander, and then battalion commander.

In 2013, he went to Germany to further his education, took a NATO operational planning course, and practiced as a staff officer at NATO's operational headquarters. In 2014, by the order of the President Ilham Aliyev, he was appointed Chief of Staff of the newly formed, restructured Nakhchivan Special General Army.

On 26 June 2014, on the 96th anniversary of the establishment of the Azerbaijani Armed Forces, he was awarded the rank of Major General by the order of the President Aliyev.

During the 2016 Nagorno–Karabakh clashes, he commanded the battles in Aghdam, Tartar, and Goranboy districts. During the 2020 Nagorno-Karabakh conflict, he led the clashes in Suqovuşan, which was captured by the Azerbaijani forces on 3 October. On 9 December, President Aliyev signed a decree to award Hasanov with the Karabakh Order.

Hasanov is fluent in English, Russian, Turkish, Persian and Armenian.

References 

1975 births
People from Fuzuli District
Azerbaijani generals
Azerbaijani military personnel of the Nagorno-Karabakh War
2016 Nagorno-Karabakh clashes
Azerbaijani Land Forces personnel of the 2020 Nagorno-Karabakh war
Living people
People's Liberation Army Nanjing Military Command College alumni